Daniel Sebastián Balmaceda (born 8 October 1996) is an Argentine footballer who plays for Juventud Unida.

References

Argentine footballers
1996 births
Living people
Association football midfielders
People from Ituzaingó Partido
Sportspeople from Buenos Aires Province
Club Atlético Tigre footballers
Club y Biblioteca Ramón Santamarina footballers
Arsenal de Sarandí footballers
Sportivo Belgrano footballers
Juventud Unida Universitario players
Argentine Primera División players
Primera Nacional players
Torneo Federal A players